"Round Here" is a song written by Mark Miller, Gregg Hubbard and Scotty Emerick, and recorded by American country music group Sawyer Brown.  It was released in November 1995 as the second single from the album This Thing Called Wantin' and Havin' It All.  The song reached number 19 on the Billboard Hot Country Singles & Tracks chart. It also peaked at number 19 on the Canadian RPM Country Tracks chart.

Content
The song discusses an unyielding commitment to enduring love.

Music video
The video for the song premiered in late 1995 and features former Major League Baseball player John Kruk.

Chart performance
Round Here" debuted at number 73 on the U.S. Billboard Hot Country Singles & Tracks for the week of November 25, 1995.

References

1996 singles
1995 songs
Sawyer Brown songs
Songs written by Scotty Emerick
Songs written by Mark Miller (musician)
Music videos directed by Michael Salomon
Curb Records singles